Wu Jing (died 203) was a Chinese military general and politician who lived during the late Eastern Han dynasty of China. He was a brother-in-law of the minor warlord Sun Jian, whose descendants became the royal family of the state of Eastern Wu in the Three Kingdoms period.

Life
Wu Jing was from Wu County, Wu Commandery (around present-day Suzhou, Jiangsu) but he grew up in Qiantang County (錢唐縣; present-day Hangzhou, Zhejiang). He was orphaned at a young age so he lived with his elder sister, Lady Wu. After Lady Wu married the general Sun Jian, Wu Jing became a subordinate of his brother-in-law.

Wu Jing participated in some battles under Sun Jian's banner and was commissioned as a Cavalry Commandant for his contributions. Sun Jian was killed in action at the Battle of Xiangyang in 191 against Liu Biao's forces. Sometime in the early 190s, Wu Jing was appointed by the warlord Yuan Shu as the Administrator of Danyang Commandery (丹楊郡; around present-day Xuancheng, Anhui), and was sent to attack and seize the commandery from its previous administrator, Zhou Xin. Wu Jing was at Qu'e County (曲阿縣; in present-day Danyang, Jiangsu) at the time and had not moved to Danyang yet. Sun Jian's eldest son, Sun Ce, brought along his family and followers, including Sun He and Lü Fan, to join Wu Jing in Qu'e County. Wu Jing combined forces with his nephew to attack the bandits led by Zu Lang in Jing County and drove the bandits away.

Later, Wu Jing came under attack by the warlord Liu Yao, so he headed north to join Yuan Shu. Yuan Shu appointed him as General of the Household Who Inspects the Army and ordered him and Sun Ce's cousin Sun Ben to lead an army to attack Liu Yao's generals Fan Neng and Yu Mi at Hengjiang. Wu Jing and Sun Ben also defeated Ze Rong and Xue Li at Moling (秣陵; present-day Nanjing, Jiangsu).

Starting in 194, Sun Ce borrowed troops from Yuan Shu and embarked on a series of conquests in the Jiangdong (or Wu) region. He attacked territories under the control of warlords such as Liu Yao, Yan Baihu and Wang Lang and conquered them. When Sun Ce was trapped in Niuzhu, Wu Jing came to his nephew's rescue and captured all the enemies. Wu Jing participated in Sun Ce's campaign against Liu Yao in 195. When Liu Yao fled to Yuzhang Commandery (豫章郡; around present-day Nanchang, Jiangxi) after his defeat, Sun Ce sent Wu Jing and Sun Ben to Shouchun (壽春; present-day Shou County, Anhui) to report his victory to Yuan Shu. Concurrently, Yuan Shu was fighting with another warlord Liu Bei for control over Xu Province, so he appointed Wu Jing as the Administrator of Guangling Commandery (廣陵郡; in present-day Jiangsu).

Around late 196 or early 197, Yuan Shu revealed his intention to declare himself emperor – an act perceived as treason against the reigning Emperor Xian. Sun Ce wrote to Yuan Shu and attempted to dissuade him from doing so, but was ignored. When Yuan Shu later did proclaim himself emperor, Sun Ce broke ties with him to avoid any association with the pretender. Sun Ce then sent a messenger to inform Wu Jing, who immediately left Guangling and brought his men to Jiangdong to join his nephew. Sun Ce reassigned Wu Jing as the Administrator of Danyang. The Han central government subsequently sent Wang Pu, a Consultant, as an envoy to Jiangdong to appoint Wu Jing as General Who Spreads Martial Might and approve his governorship of Danyang.

Wu Jing died in office in 203 during the reign of Emperor Xian.

Descendants
Wu Jing's son, Wu Fen, was commissioned as a military officer, placed in command of some troops, and enfeoffed as the Marquis of Xin Village. In 219, when Sun Quan (Sun Ce's younger brother and successor) and his general Lü Meng attacked Jing Province, Wu Fen was appointed as the Commandant of Wu Commandery and was tasked with defending Sun Quan's home territories. Wu Fen was succeeded by his son, Wu An, after his death. In the 240s, a power struggle broke out between Sun Quan's sons Sun Ba and Sun He, both of whom were fighting for the succession to their father's throne. Wu An supported Sun Ba during the contention and died in the aftermath.

Wu Fen's younger brother, Wu Qi, was made a Marquis of a Chief Village. Wu Qi was close friends with Zhang Wen and Gu Tan. Wu Qi's marquis title was inherited by his son, Wu Zuan, after his death. Wu Zuan married Teng Yin's daughter. In 256, when Teng Yin was executed for plotting against the regent Sun Chen, Wu Zuan was implicated and lost his life as well.

See also
 Eastern Wu family trees#Sun Jian
 Lists of people of the Three Kingdoms

References

 Chen, Shou (3rd century). Records of the Three Kingdoms (Sanguozhi).
 
 Pei, Songzhi (5th century). Annotations to Records of the Three Kingdoms (Sanguozhi zhu).

2nd-century births
203 deaths
Generals under Sun Quan
Han dynasty generals from Jiangsu
Han dynasty politicians from Jiangsu
Political office-holders in Anhui
Political office-holders in Jiangsu
Officials under Sun Quan
Sun Ce and associates
Yuan Shu and associates